Gretta may refer to:

People
 Gretta Bowen (1880–1981), self-taught Irish artist
 Gretta Chambers (1927–2017), Canadian journalist and former Chancellor of McGill University
 Gretta Cohn, American cellist and radio producer
 Gretta Duisenberg (born 1942), Dutch political activist 
 Gretta Kehoe-Quigley, former camogie player, captain of the All Ireland Camogie Championship
 Gretta Kok (born 1944), retired Dutch breaststroke swimmer
 Gretta Lange Bader (1931–2014), American sculptor
 Gretta Pecl, Australian marine ecologist
 Gretta Sarfaty Marchant, international artist and curator
 Gretta Taslakian (born 1985), Lebanese sprinter of Armenian descent
 Gretta Taylor (née Francis), musician and teacher from Trinidad and Tobago
 Gretta Vosper (born 1958), Canadian minister, writer and leader within the Progressive Christianity movement

See also
 Greta (disambiguation)

Feminine given names